The  Lycoming R-680 is a nine-cylinder air-cooled radial engine, the first aero engine produced by Lycoming. The engine was produced in two types, the E and B series; both are essentially the same. The B4E was available in a trainer version with a front exhaust collector "ring" for use without cylinder air baffles. R-680 received Approved Type Certificate No. 42 on 4 Feb 1930.

Variants
R-680B4E
R-680BA
Rated at 
R-680E3A
R-680-6
Rated at 
R-680-13

Applications
 Beech AT-10 Wichita
 Boeing-Stearman PT-13
 Cessna AT-8/AT-17
 Curtiss-Wright AT-9
 Fleetwings BQ-2
 Spartan NP-1
 Stinson Airliner
 Stinson Reliant
 Stinson Vigilant
 Waco S Series

Specifications (R-680-E3A)

See also

References

Notes

Bibliography

1920s aircraft piston engines
Aircraft air-cooled radial piston engines
R-680